Renta may refer to
Renta, Greater Poland Voivodeship, village in Poland
Renta 4 Banco, a bank in Spain
Renta Nishioka, Japanese kickboxer
Renta (surname)
Renta!, a Japanese digital manga distributor owned by Papyless

See also
Renta congelada, Mexican sitcom